The 1949 William & Mary Indians football team represented the College of William & Mary in Williamsburg, Virginia during the 1949 college football season. The 1940s was the most successful decade in William & Mary football history. The Indians amassed more wins than any other decade (and this includes a non-existent 1943 season due to World War II), had the largest positive-point differential, won two conference championships and qualified for back-to-back bowl games in 1947 and 1948. There were 24 National Football League (NFL) Draft selections, which is the most all-time for William & Mary in a single decade. Additionally, the 1940s was the only decade in which William & Mary was an Associated Press nationally ranked team as a major college football team.

Schedule

NFL Draft selections

References 

William and Mary
William & Mary Tribe football seasons
William